Ricardo Jurado (born 17 April 1972) is a Spanish equestrian. He competed in two events at the 2000 Summer Olympics.

References

1972 births
Living people
Spanish male equestrians
Olympic equestrians of Spain
Equestrians at the 2000 Summer Olympics
Sportspeople from Seville